Unibox is a satellite, cable and terrestrial digital receiver (set-top box). It has been distributed widely for use with Pay TV. It also enables the receiver to store digital copies of MPEG TS on internal harddisk or networked filesystems.

Linux on the Uni-box
Unibox was based on the Linux operating system. 

Originally Unibox was developed in Korea and sold in Europe, CIS, the Middle East and so on. Enthusiast groups in all over the world have developed localized software versions for the Unibox.

Unibox models
There have been a number of different models of Unibox available. The numbers are suffixed with -S for Satellite, -T for Terrestrial and -C for Cable:

UD-Combo 
This is essentially a full high definition(1080p) version of the UD Combo(S2+T) PVR, a 450 MHz MIPS processor, 32MB of Flash memory, 256MB of RAM. It also features one HDMI, two USB 2.0, one e-SATA and one 10/100 Mbit/s Ethernet interfaces. It has a VFD display.

UD-1000HD(180 x 145 x 40) 
This is full high definition(1080p) USB PVR. It also features one HDMI, two USB 2.0, one 10/100 Mbit/s Ethernet interfaces. It has and touchpad on front.

UD-1100HD(180 x 145 x 40) 
This is essentially a full high definition(1080p) version of the UD-1000HD(S2/T/C) USB PVR, a 450 MHz MIPS processor, 32MB of Flash memory, 256MB of RAM. It also features one HDMI, one USB 2.0, one 10/100 Mbit/s Ethernet interfaces. It has and touchpad on front.

The main differences of the UD-1100HD compared to the UD-1000HD are one USB port.

UD-2000HD(280 x 180 x 58) 
This is full high definition(1080p) USB PVR. It supports one fixed tuner and one detachable tuner module(S2,T,C). It also features one HDMI, two USB 2.0, one eSATA, two Common Interface, two Smart card, one Optical and one 10/100 Mbit/s Ethernet interfaces.

Plug-ins 
There are also many 3rd party plugins available. Plugins such as Weather forecast, YouTube, IRC chatting, WebCam, youporn, torrent are available.

In addition, unofficial third-party conditional access software modules (CAMs or emulators) are widely circulated on the Internet that emulate the CA systems developed by NDS (VideoGuard), Irdeto, Conax, Nagravision, Viaccess and other proprietary vendors. Some Uni-box owners use these softcams in conjunction with card sharing software to access pay TV services without a subscription card inserted in every connected box. This practice may be illegal in some jurisdictions and third-party software for this purpose is neither officially endorsed nor supported by UNIDIS and voids the official warranty.

See also
 Dreambox
 Slingbox
 Vu+
 DBox2
 TV2Me - the original placeshifting device, developed by Ken Schaffer
 LocationFree Player
 HDHomeRun
 Monsoon HAVA
 Hauppauge MediaMVP - another connected device based on the IBM STB02500 chip
 Home theater PC
 Moxi
 Telly (home entertainment server)

References

External links
 Linux DVB API
 ST Linux
 DVB
 ETSI

Satellite television
Set-top box
Television technology
Digital video recorders
Linux-based devices